Arthur Short may refer to:

Arthur Short (cricketer) (born 1947), South African cricketer
Arthur Short (politician) (1850–1933), politician in the British colony of South Australia
Arthur Ernest William Short (1890–1949), South Australian businessman and city councillor
Arthur Rendle Short (1880–1953), professor of surgery at Bristol University

See also
Arthur Shortt (1899–1984), British Army officer